Ballerina is a 1950 French drama film directed by Ludwig Berger and starring Violette Verdy, Gabrielle Dorziat and Henri Guisol. It was produced and distributed by the French branch of Lux Film. The film's sets were designed by the art director Robert Gys. It was the final cinema film of the German director Berger, who moved into directing in television. It also known by the alternative title Dream Ballerina.

Synopsis
A young ballerina makes her on the stage of the theatre in her local French town, but is distracted and performs poorly. That night she dreams a series of various scenarios about a young male tearaway who has shown an interest in her. The following night she gives a perfect second performance.

Cast
 Violette Verdy as 	Nicole
 Gabrielle Dorziat as 	Aunt
 Henri Guisol as 	Jeweler
 Philippe Nicaud as Loulou
 Nicholas Orloff as 	Dancer
 Romney Brent as Director
 Jean Mercure as Dancer
 Micheline Boudet as Marie
 Margo Lion as l'épouse du directeur
 Pierre Sergeol as  l'inspecteur

References

Bibliography 
 Huckenpahler, Victoria. Ballerina: A Biography of Violette Verdy. Audience Arts, 1978.

External links 
 

1950 drama films
French drama films
1950 films
1950s French-language films
Films directed by Ludwig Berger
1950s French films